Yerik is a rural locality (a khutor) in Verkhnebuzinovskoye Rural Settlement, Kletsky District, Volgograd Oblast, Russia. The population was 80 as of 2010.

Geography 
Yerik is located on the bank of the Bystry Yerik, 56 km south of Kletskaya (the district's administrative centre) by road. Mayorovsky is the nearest rural locality.

References 

Rural localities in Kletsky District